The Laureus World Sports Award for Action Sportsperson of the Year, known as the Alternative Sportsperson of the Year prior to 2007, is an annual award honouring the achievements of individual athletes from the world of action sports. It was first awarded in 2000 as one of the seven constituent awards presented during the Laureus World Sports Awards. The awards are presented by the Laureus Sport for Good Foundation, a global organisation involved in more than 150 charity projects supporting 500,000 young people. The first ceremony was held on 25 May 2000 in Monte Carlo, at which Nelson Mandela gave the keynote speech. Nominations for the award come from a specialist panel. The Laureus World Sports Academy then selects the winner who is presented with a Laureus statuette, created by Cartier, at an annual awards ceremony held in various locations around the world. The awards are considered highly prestigious and are frequently referred to as the sporting equivalent of "Oscars".

The inaugural winner of the Laureus World Sports Award for Action Sportsperson of the Year, in 2000, was the American multi-sports athlete Shaun Palmer. It has been awarded posthumously on one occasion, in 2006 to the Italian hang glider Angelo d'Arrigo who was killed in an air crash in March of that year. Americans are the most successful with nine awards, while surfers have been recognised most often of any sport with six awards; American surfer Kelly Slater is the only individual to have received the award on multiple occasions with four wins. The award has been presented to five women during its history: the Australian surfers Layne Beachley (2004) and Stephanie Gilmore (2010), the British yachtswoman Ellen MacArthur (2005), and  the British mountain biker Rachel Atherton (2017), and twice to the American snowboarder Chloe Kim, who won the award in 2019 and 2020.

List of winners and nominees

References

Action Sportsperson of the Year
Awards established in 2000